Tyler Scott is an American football wide receiver for the Cincinnati Bearcats.

Early life and high school
Scott grew up in Norton, Ohio and attended Norton High School, where he played basketball and football and was a sprinter on the track team. He played running back for Norton and rushed 243 times for 1,512 yards and scored 27 total touchdowns in his junior season. Scott rushed for 1,337 yards and 21 touchdowns as a senior. He was rated a three-star recruit and committed to play college football at Cincinnati over offers from Indiana, Iowa State, Michigan State, Nebraska, Rutgers, and Syracuse.

College career
Scott played in ten games during his freshman season and caught three passes for 20 yards and rushed one time for 20 yards. He became a starter as a sophomore and finished the season with 30 receptions for 520 yards and five touchdowns. Scott was named second team All-American Athletic Conference as a junior after catching 54 passes for 899 yards and nine touchdowns. At the end of the season, he opted to skip the 2022 Fenway Bowl and declared that he would be entering the 2023 NFL draft.

References

External links
Cincinnati Bearcats bio

Living people
Players of American football from Ohio
American football wide receivers
Cincinnati Bearcats football players
Year of birth missing (living people)